The HK P11 is a Heckler & Koch pistol designed as an underwater firearm that was developed in 1976. It has five barrels and each fires a 7.62 X 36mm dart electrically. Loading is by means of a five-round case. The design resembles that of a pepper-box firearm.

Design
Since ordinary-shaped rounds are inaccurate and have a very short range when used underwater, this pistol fires steel darts. It has five barrels, each of which is loaded with a cartridge, giving the gun a pepper-box appearance, and it is electrically ignited from a battery pack in the pistol grip.

After firing all five cartridges, the barrel unit must be sent back to its manufacturer for reloading.  It is very similar to its predecessor, the Mk 1 Underwater Defense Gun. In the past, Heckler & Koch has denied knowledge of its existence.

This firearm is somewhat bulkier than its Soviet counterpart, the SPP-1 underwater pistol, but it has five barrels, as opposed to the Soviet firearm which has four. However, the SPP-1 does not need to be sent back to the manufacturer to be reloaded.

Users

: German commando frogmen.

: Italian Navy COMSUBIN.
: Pasukan Khas Laut (PASKAL) of the Royal Malaysian Navy

: Special Boat Service of the British Royal Navy.

See also

Notes

References

External links
 HKPRO: The HK P11
 Securityarms: Heckler & Koch P11 Underwater Pistol
 Modern Firearms: Heckler Koch HK P11 underwater pistol

Multiple-barrel firearms
Flechette firearms
Underwater pistols
P11
Cold War weapons of Germany
Military equipment introduced in the 1970s